1,1,3,3-Tetramethoxypropane is an organic compound with the formula CH(CH(OCH)).  A colorless liquid, it is a protected form of malondialdehyde, a usefully reactive reagent that has poor storage properties.

References

Acetals
Protecting groups